William Underwood (26 February 1852 – 9 May 1914) was an English first-class cricketer active 1874–1895 who played for Nottinghamshire. He was born in Ruddington, Nottinghamshire; died in Bradmore, Nottinghamshire.

References

1852 births
1914 deaths
English cricketers
Nottinghamshire cricketers